Ellipsoolithus is an oogenus of dinosaur egg. It contains only a single oospecies, E. khedaensis. The species was found in the Upper Sandy Carbonate Member of the Lameta Formation of India. These eggs were probably laid by a theropod dinosaur.

See also 
 List of dinosaur oogenera

References

Bibliography 
 D. M. Mohabey. 1998. Systematics of Indian Upper Cretaceous dinosaur and chelonian eggshells. Journal of Vertebrate Paleontology 18(2):348-362

Elongatoolithids
Dinosaur reproduction
Maastrichtian life
Cretaceous India
Fossils of India
Fossil parataxa described in 1998